Neil Stuart Hodgson (born 20 November 1973) is a British former motorcycle racer, who won the 2000 British Superbike Championship, and the 2003 Superbike World Championship titles. He then went on to have a moderately successful four years in the American Superbike Championship, with a best 5th place championship finish.

At the start of the 2010 season Hodgson returned to the British Superbike Championship with the Motorpoint Yamaha team managed by Rob McElnea. However, on 22 April 2010 Hodgson announced his retirement from British superbikes and competitive motorcycle racing, due to a shoulder injury sustained in a motocross accident during the previous AMA season. Hodgson aggravated the injury in the first round of the British Superbike Championship at the Brands Hatch Indy circuit.

Hodgson now divides his time between family in the Isle of Man whilst working as a motorcycle racing commentator and TV studio pundit, road racing trackday instructor and as an ambassador for motorcycle companies including Ducati.

Personal life
Hodgson was born in Burnley and lived there and in Nelson and Colne, Lancashire during his early life, attending Ss John Fisher and Thomas More RC High School. He was 6 when he started riding his brother's bike around playing fields in Brierfield near his grandma's home. Hodgson has a daughter Hollie-Jean and son Taylor.  He lives in Onchan on the Isle of Man.  His hobbies include motocross, trials and mountain biking. He supports Burnley F.C.

Career

Early career
A schoolboy motocross rider from 1982 through 1989, and was voted Rider of the Year in season 1986–87.  Hodgson made the leap to road racing on Easter Sunday 1990 at a meeting at Langbaurgh (Teesside Autodrome), on a Yamaha TZR125.  His first win was at the Three Sisters meeting in that same year.  He came 8th in his first season in the British Clubman's Ministock. In 1992, he moved to the 125cc International Supercup, and became British National 125cc Champion aged 18.  He was then selected to compete in the FIM World 125cc Championship as the youngest rider in the series and Britain's only representative in the class with Team Burnett (Roger Burnett), placing 24th in the Championship.  In 1994, he was selected by HRC Honda as one of only five officially supported riders in 125cc World Championship with Team Burnett.  He took part in two 500cc World Championship races for the Harris-Yamaha team.

500cc World Championship (1995)
In 1995, he moved full-time to 500cc World Championship with WCM, developing a reputation for being a smooth but impetuous rider who crashed a lot – he came 11th in the Championship.

Superbike World Championship (1996–1998)
For 1996, he moved to the Superbike World Championship (aka 'WSBK') with Ducati, and this began a frustrating three-year spell in the series, the latter two years with Fuchs Kawasaki.  9th was Hodgson's best championship finish in this era.  His first podium came at Laguna Seca Raceway in 1996.

British Superbike Championship (1999–2000)
For 1999, he returned to the British Superbike Championship (BSB) with GSE Racing, and spent the season re-establishing himself on a superbike and regaining his confidence.  His teammate at GSE Racing Troy Bayliss took the British Superbike title.  2000 saw one of the most titanic battles British Superbike had ever seen, as Hodgson battled Chris Walker who was riding for Suzuki, all season long.  The championship came down to the last race of the year at Donington Park, and for most of the race it looked like Walker would take the title. However, with just 3 laps to go Walker's engine blew, allowing Hodgson to take the title.  He also won two races of the British rounds of the Superbike World Championship that year as a 'wildcard' entry – one at Donington Park and one at Brands Hatch.  The most memorable race of Hodgson's British Superbike title winning year was at Oulton Park, when he started race 1 from the back of the grid due after he stalled his bike, and ended up winning the race in breathtaking style, much to the amazement of the British crowd and his fellow competitors. The most controversial moment of the season came in race 2, when him and Walker came together on the final lap of the race battling for the win, resulting in Walker going down and Hodgson receiving a post-race penalty.

Return to Superbike (2001–2003)
GSE Racing stepped up to the Superbike World Championship series full-time for 2001, with Hodgson joined in the Ducati satellite team by up and coming English rider James Toseland.  Hodgson was a race winner and 5th overall that year, while in 2002, Bayliss and Colin Edwards were dominant, although Neil took pole positions en route to 3rd overall.  After both Bayliss and Edwards left for MotoGP, Hodgson became the number one rider for the works Ducati team in 2003, winning the title against teammate Ruben Xaus.
Hodgson starred in a video called RIDE with EagleE and The Schlepp Riders also starring: Phil Greening, DJ Sassy, Princess the hit song maker of Say I'm Your No.1 fame in the 1980s. Also featuring Jason Fin.

MotoGP World Championship (2004)
For 2004, both Hodgson and Xaus went to Ducati's second-string MotoGP team, Team d'Antin Ducati.  But the power delivery of the Desmosedici was extreme compared to a WSB Superbike, and the team had limited sponsorships and funds to run a test programme.  Resultantly, Hodgson never felt he had the bike set up like he ever wanted it to be, while Xaus's natural extreme style appeared to get more out of the machine.  Xaus ended up as rookie of the year, while a disillusioned Hodgson came 17th in the championship.

AMA Superbike Championship (2005–2009)
Hodgson at the time vowed never to return to MotoGP, stating that a combination of his age and nationality was now against him, and he would never be offered the best machinery capable of competing let alone winning.  Having shown loyalty to Ducati throughout his motorcycle racing experience, the question now was where to place him.  Ducati had a 'works' team focusing on making Régis Laconi the next WSB champion, and Hodgson didn't want to return to the Superbike World Championship in a satellite team, or to British Superbikes.  Resultantly, with the stated aim of becoming the first rider to win all three Superbike titles of 'British', 'World' and 'American', he moved into the less-prestigious American Motorcyclist Association (AMA) championship in the United States for 2005 – he came sixth to Mat Mladin.  Hodgson finished the 2006 AMA Superbike Championship in 5th place.

Ducati pulled out of the AMA Superbike Championship for at least the 2007 season, and Hodgson failed to obtain another ride as the 2007 Superbike World Championship opened.  Hodgson was linked to joining Yamaha France from round 3 onwards, and to a temporary ride for Suzuki in WSBK.  On 11 April he was confirmed as a test and development rider for Ducati, replacing the injured Shinichi Ito. Rizla Suzuki gave Neil a test on the team's Suzuki GSX-R1000 for tests of the bike taking place at Cadwell Park, but despite speculation he was not intended to replace Chris Walker.

He returned to the AMA Superbike Championship for one round at Mazda Raceway Laguna Seca on a Corona Honda, partnering James Ellison, finishing fifth. At the Sachsenring MotoGP round he was revealed to have rejected a chance to stand in for Toni Elías on a Gresini Honda at this race, as he thought that it would impact his chances of landing a full-time Superbike ride, probably with Ten Kate Honda after an earlier speculated deal to ride for Fogarty Racing on an MV Agusta dissipated.  On 5 September 2007, Honda America announced that Hodgson would race for them in the 2008 AMA Superbike season, riding the new Fireblade.
In 2008, Hodgson came 6th in the AMA Superbike Championship, picking up 2 3rd-place finishes at Miller Motorsports Park. These were his best results of the season, towards the end of the season Hodgson became more inconsistent collecting low scores in 1 race of every round from 8–10. Hodgson signed a contract to keep him with the Corona Honda team for the 2009 season.
In 2009, Hodgson started the season off strongly with a second-place finish at the Daytona circuit. Hodgson then had an accident in training on a motocross bike, causing him to suffer a collapsed lung and a dislocated shoulder causing him to miss the next 3 rounds. Hodgson would eventually finish 11th on 167 points.

Return to British Superbikes (2010)
Hodgson confirmed that he would be returning to British Superbikes for the 2010 season, with Motorpoint Yamaha alongside youngster Dan Linfoot. 
On 22 April 2010 Hodgson announced that he was retiring from British superbikes and competitive motorcycle racing, due to the shoulder injury he picked up in a motorcross accident during the previous AMA season. Hodgson had aggravated the injury in the first round of the British Superbike Championship at the Brands Hatch Indy circuit on 5 April. Hodgson was replaced in the Motorpoint Yamaha team by Ian Lowry.

Support for charity
Hodgson is a patron of the National Association for Bikers with a Disability.

Career statistics

Grand Prix motorcycle racing

Races by year
(key) (Races in bold indicate pole position, races in italics indicate fastest lap)

Superbike World Championship

Races by year
(key) (Races in bold indicate pole position, races in italics indicate fastest lap)

References

External links

Ducati Racing – National championships includes News on AMA
Parts Unlimited website includes section on AMA and Hodgson
Official 2003 WSB Championship site
Club Hodgson an American fan site
Bio at BikeGirl.co.uk
BBC Radio Lancashire interview with Hodgson on 2003 WSB Championship
SuperBike Planet Interview 2005
Corona Honda Racing website Team News

1973 births
Living people
Sportspeople from Burnley
British motorcycle racers
English motorcycle racers
British Superbike Championship riders
Superbike World Championship riders
MotoGP World Championship riders
AMA Superbike Championship riders
125cc World Championship riders
500cc World Championship riders